Deepam TV is a UK-based Tamil Channel in Europe Tamil language digital satellite Free to Air (FTA). Its main audience are Sri Lankan Tamils and Indian Tamil living in Europe and the Middle East.

The channel was launched in June 2000. The channel broadcasts 24 hours a day from its studios in Hayes (west London). The channel is available across Europe, the Middle East and North Africa via Eutelsat's Eurobird 9 satellite. Also it is watchable worldwide via DBX. The channel is licensed to broadcast by Norwegian Media authority (Medietilsynet).

in 2013, Deepam Television Network has started four more 24 hours channels such as Isaicharal (Music Channel) Thiracharal (Movie Channel), Kalakalappu (comedy Channel) Deepam News (News Channel). These Channels are in full HD, watchable via DeeBox.

Deepam Radio
Deepam Television network has started their online Radio in 2013. it is also available in DeeBox

References
 
 

Tamil-language television channels
Television channels and stations established in 2000